Christiane Wildschek (née Casapicola; born 5 July 1954) is an Austrian sprinter. She competed in the women's 400 metres at the 1976 Summer Olympics.

References

1954 births
Living people
Athletes (track and field) at the 1972 Summer Olympics
Athletes (track and field) at the 1976 Summer Olympics
Austrian female sprinters
Olympic athletes of Austria
Place of birth missing (living people)
Olympic female sprinters